Vincent Hugo Bendix (August 12, 1881 – March 27, 1945) was an American inventor and industrialist. Vincent Bendix was a pioneer and leader in both the automotive and aviation industries during the 1920s and 1930s.

Background
Vincent Hugo Bendix was born in Moline, Illinois. He was eldest of three children born to Methodist clergyman, Reverend Jann Bengtsson, a native of Ångermanland, Sweden, and his wife Anna Danielson, also an immigrant from Sweden. While in Moline the family name was changed to "Bendix". They later moved to Chicago, Illinois and Vincent purchased the Palmer Mansion in 1930, for $3,000,000.

Career
In 1907 Vincent Bendix founded the Bendix Corporation of Chicago to manufacture automobiles, called Bendix Motor Buggies. After two years and producing 7,000 vehicles the company failed. In 1910 however, Bendix invented and patented the Bendix drive, a gear that could engage an engine at zero rotational speed and then (through the aid of a spring and the higher speed of the running engine) pull back and disengage automatically at higher speed (nominally the engine's running speed). This drive made the electric starter practical for automobile engines and later for engines in aircraft and other motorized vehicles.

In 1922 his father was killed when he was hit by a car with drum brakes; his father's death inspired him to study braking systems. He found a French braking system that he considered to be superior to any braking systems available in the United States's market. In 1923, Bendix founded the Bendix Brake Company, which acquired the rights to French engineer Henri Perrot's patents for brake drum/shoe design a year later.

In 1929, he started the Bendix Aviation Corporation and founded the Transcontinental Bendix Air Race in 1931. In 1942, Bendix started Bendix Helicopters, Inc.  Bendix Aviation and Bendix Brake would later be renamed Bendix Corporation.

Death
Bendix died at his home in New York on March 27, 1945, of coronary thrombosis.

Honors
1929 -  Knight of the Swedish Order of the Polar Star
1931 -  President of the Society of Automotive Engineers
1936 - Knight of the French Legion of Honor.
1984 - Inducted into the Automotive Hall of Fame
1991 - Inducted into the National Aviation Hall of Fame

See also
Bendix (Automobile)
Chateau Bendix
Bendix Trophy

References

Further reading
Cunningham, Mary, with Fran Schumer, Powerplay: What Really Happened at Bendix (Linden Press/Simon and Schuster, 1984)
Garraty, John A., and Mark C. Carnes, American National Biography (Oxford University Press, 1999)
 Hallett, Anthony  and  Diane Hallett Entrepreneur magazine encyclopedia of entrepreneurs  (Wiley. October 24, 1997)

External links
 "Rites for Vincent Bendix", The New York Times, April 1, 1945 
 Bendix Appliances homepage
 Popular Mechanics: "Certificate of Brake Test Made Automatically by Small Recorder" (April 1936) — portable brake testing unit developed and sold by Bendix in the 1930s.
 Bendixline (1957–1958, 1962–1964) – Digitized copies of the Bendix Products Division newsletter

1881 births
1945 deaths
20th-century American inventors
American founders of automobile manufacturers
American people of Swedish descent
Automotive businesspeople
Burials at Graceland Cemetery (Chicago)
Chevaliers of the Légion d'honneur
Engineers from Illinois
Knights of the Order of the Polar Star
National Aviation Hall of Fame inductees
People from Chicago
People from Moline, Illinois
People in aviation
Bendix Corporation people